A mixed breed is a domesticated animal descended from multiple breeds of the same species, often breeding without any human intervention, recordkeeping, or selective breeding. Examples include:

 Mixed-breed dog, a dog whose ancestry is complex or not known, also colloquially known as "mutt"
 Grade horse, a horse whose parentage is unknown, unidentifiable, or of significantly mixed breeding
 A domestic short-haired cat or domestic long-haired cat of no particular breed, colloquially called a "moggy" or "moggie" in some dialects

See also
 Crossbreed - where the animal's parentage is deliberately selected
 Hybrid - a mix between species
 Feral animal - may descend from multiple breeds
 Multiracial

References

Animal breeding
Domesticated animals